The 2017 Chinese Figure Skating Championships was held on December 24 and 25, 2016 in Jilin City. Medals were awarded in the disciplines of men's singles, ladies' singles, pair skating, and ice dancing.

Results

Men

Ladies

Pairs

Ice dance

References

Chinese Figure Skating Championships
2016 in figure skating
Chinese Figure Skating Championships, 2017
Sport in Jilin